Anderson Santana dos Santos, known as Anderson Santana or Anderson Mineiro in Brazil (born April 24, 1986), is a Brazilian left back who last played for Aktobe in the Kazakhstan Premier League.

Career
At the start of March 2014, Anderson Santana left Chornomorets Odesa due to the civil unrest caused by the 2014 Ukrainian revolution.

On 12 June 2014, Anderson Santana joined Kazakhstan Premier League side Aktobe on an 18-month contract.

Career statistics

References

External links
 CBF

1986 births
Living people
Brazilian footballers
Brazilian expatriate footballers
Cruzeiro Esporte Clube players
Clube Náutico Capibaribe players
Sociedade Esportiva do Gama players
Associação Desportiva Cabofriense players
Tupi Football Club players
FC Akhmat Grozny players
Vitória S.C. players
FC Chornomorets Odesa players
FC Aktobe players
Primeira Liga players
Ukrainian Premier League players
Kazakhstan Premier League players
Expatriate footballers in Russia
Expatriate footballers in Portugal
Expatriate footballers in Ukraine
Expatriate footballers in Kazakhstan
Brazilian expatriate sportspeople in Ukraine
Association football defenders
Footballers from Belo Horizonte